Ameer Haider Khan Hoti is a Pakistani Pashtun politician who was the Chief Minister of Khyber Pakhtunkhwa from 2008 to 2013. During his government, the province was renamed from "North-West Frontier Province" to "Khyber Pakhtunkhwa." Hoti has been a member of the National Assembly of Pakistan since August 2018, and from June 2013 to May 2018. He is the Senior Vice President of the Awami National Party (ANP).

Personal life and education
Hoti was born on 5 February 1971 to the former federal minister of Khyber Pakhtunkhwa, Azam Khan Hoti. Hoti is a nephew of Asfandyar Wali Khan, the president of ANP. He has two sons and one daughter. 

He received his education from Aitchison College, and graduated from Edwardes College Peshawar.

Political career
Hoti started his political career in 1990.

Provincial Assembly of Khyber Pakhtunkhwa from Mardan constituency in 2002 Pakistani general election, but was unsuccessful.

He was elected for the first time to the Provincial Assembly of Khyber Pakhtunkhwa from PK-23 Mardan constituency in 2008 Pakistani general election. Following the election, he was elected as the Chief Minister of Khyber Pakhtunkhwa in March 2008 where he remained until March 2013. He is considered as the youngest and the longest-serving elected chief minister of Khyber Pakhtunkhwa.

He was elected to the National Assembly of Pakistan from NA-9 (Mardan-I) in 2013 Pakistani general election.

In 2014, he was elected as the provincial president of Awami National Party (ANP).

He was re-elected to the National Assembly as a candidate of ANP from Constituency NA-21 (Mardan-II) in 2018 Pakistani general election.

References

1971 births
Living people
People from Mardan District
Pashtun people
Awami National Party politicians
Chief Ministers of Khyber Pakhtunkhwa
Aitchison College alumni
Pakistani MNAs 2013–2018
Edwardes College alumni
Pakistani MNAs 2018–2023